All Time Greatest Hits is a compilation album by American rock band Lynyrd Skynyrd, released in 2000. The album was certified gold on March 24, 2003 and platinum on June 20, 2005 by the RIAA.

Track listing 
"Sweet Home Alabama" (Ed King, Gary Rossington, Ronnie Van Zant) – 4:45
"Gimme Three Steps" (Allen Collins, Van Zant) – 4:31
"Simple Man" (Rossington, Van Zant) – 5:58
"Saturday Night Special" (King, Van Zant) – 5:11
"Swamp Music" (King, Van Zant) – 3:32
"The Ballad of Curtis Loew" (Collins, Van Zant) – 4:52
"Call Me the Breeze" (J.J. Cale) – 5:09
"Comin' Home" (Collins, Van Zant) – 5:32
"Gimme Back My Bullets" (Rossington, Van Zant) – 3:30
"What's Your Name?" (Rossington, Van Zant) – 3:33
"You Got That Right" (Steve Gaines, Van Zant) – 3:47
"All I Can Do Is Write About It" (Acoustic version) (Collins, Van Zant) – 4:24
"That Smell" (Collins, Van Zant) – 5:49
"Free Bird" (Live) (Collins, Van Zant) – 14:23

Tracks 1 and 5–7 from Second Helping (1974)
Tracks 2–3 from (Pronounced 'Lĕh-'nérd 'Skin-'nérd) (1973)
Track 4 from Nuthin' Fancy (1975)
Track 8 from Skynyrd's First and... Last (1978)
Track 9 from Gimme Back My Bullets (1976)
Tracks 10-11 and 13 from Street Survivors (1977)
Track 12 from the Lynyrd Skynyrd Box Set (1991)
Track 14 from One More from the Road (1976) and recorded live July 8, 1976, at the Fox Theatre in Atlanta, Georgia

Charts

Weekly charts

Year-end charts

Certifications

References 

2000 greatest hits albums
Albums produced by Tom Dowd
Lynyrd Skynyrd compilation albums
MCA Records compilation albums